The 95th Reconnaissance Squadron is a squadron of the United States Air Force.  It is assigned to the 55th Operations Group, Air Combat Command, stationed at Offutt Air Force Base, Nebraska. The squadron is equipped with several variants of the Boeing C-135 aircraft equipped for reconnaissance missions.

The 95th is one of the oldest units in the United States Air Force, first being organized as the 95th Aero Squadron on 20 August 1917 at Kelly Field, Texas.   The squadron deployed to France and fought on the Western Front during World War I as a pursuit squadron.

During World War II the unit served in the Mediterranean Theater of Operations (MTO) as part of Twelfth Air Force as a B-26 Marauder light bomber squadron, participating in the North African and the Southern France Campaign.  In the Cold War, the squadron fought in the Korean War with Douglas B-26 Invader medium bombers, then later as part of Strategic Air Command, flying TR-1A Dragonlady reconnaissance aircraft supporting NATO.

Mission
Conducts RC-135 Rivet Joint flight operations in the European and Mediterranean theaters of operations as tasked by National Command Authorities and European Command. Provides all operational management, aircraft maintenance, administration, and intelligence support to produce politically sensitive real-time intelligence data vital to national foreign policy. Supports EC-135, OC-135 Open Skies, and Boeing E-4B missions when theater deployed.

Although it is a component of the 55th Operations Group, main flying operations are conducted from RAF Mildenhall, United Kingdom and Souda Bay, Crete.

History

World War I
The 95th was originally activated as the 95th Aero Squadron (a fighter unit) on 20 August 1917 at Kelly Field in Texas. It deployed to various locations in France during World War I, initially at Issoudun Aerodrome. On 5 May 1918, it was assigned to the 1st Pursuit Group. Well-known pilots with the 95th Aero Squadron who perished in World War I included Lt. Quentin Roosevelt, the youngest son of President Theodore Roosevelt, and Irby Curry. Both of them died while the squadron was based in Saints Aerodrome, France. A number of aces also served with the unit, including Lansing Holden, Sumner Sewall, Harold Buckley, Edward Peck Curtis, James Knowles, and one of its commanding officers, Captain David M. Peterson.

After the war ended on 11 November 1918, the 95th Aero Squadron was demobilized on 18 March 1919.  As the 95th Pursuit Squadron it conducted bombing missions on the Clinton River to prevent flooding in communities near the river caused by an ice jam.  As the 95th Attack Squadron, it flew reconnaissance missions in March 1938 to support flood relief operations in southern California.

Interwar years
The 95th Aero Squadron underwent various activations and inactivations over the years and experienced numerous name changes.

World War II
During World War II, it was known as the 95th Bombardment Squadron (Medium) and was a squadron in the 17th Bombardment Group that provided North American B-25 Mitchells and 6 crews for the Doolittle Raid and later flew the Martin B-26 Marauder in the Mediterranean Theatre of Operations.

Korean War

Reconnaissance operations
After being inactivated on 25 June 1958, it was redesignated as the 95th Reconnaissance Squadron on 20 January 1982 and reactivated at RAF Alconbury in the United Kingdom on 1 October 1982.  It flew Lockheed U-2 and TR-1 aircraft in support of NATO and United States Air Forces Europe missions.  After the end of the Cold War, the 95th was no longer needed and the unit was inactivated on 15 September 1993.  This hiatus did not last long as the unit was reactivated on 1 July 1994 at RAF Mildenhall, this time flying the RC-135 Rivet Joint and OC-135 Open Skies aircraft.

Lineage
 Organized as the 95th Aero Squadron (Pursuit) on 20 August 1917
 Redesignated as: 95th Aero Squadron (Pursuit), on 5 March 1918
 Demobilized on 18 March 1919<
 Reconstituted and organized on 12 August 1919
 Redesignated 95th Squadron (Pursuit) on 14 March 1921
 Redesignated 95th Pursuit Squadron on 30 September 1922
 Redesignated 95th Pursuit Squadron, Air Service on 25 January 1923
 Redesignated 95th Pursuit Squadron, Air Corps on 8 August 1926
 Inactivated on 31 July 1927
 Redesignated 95th Pursuit Squadron and activated, on 1 June 1928
 Redesignated 95th Attack Squadron on 1 March 1935
 Redesignated 95th Bombardment Squadron (Medium) on 17 October 1939
 Redesignated 95th Bombardment Squadron, Medium on 9 October 1944
 Inactivated on 26 November 1945
 Redesignated 95th Bombardment Squadron, Light on 29 April 1947
 Activated on 19 May 1947
 Inactivated on 10 September 1948
 Redesignated 95th Bombardment Squadron, Light, Night Intruder on 8 May 1952
 Activated on 10 May 1952
 Redesignated 95th Bombardment Squadron, Tactical on 1 October 1955
 Inactivated on 25 June 1958
 Redesignated 95th Reconnaissance Squadron on 20 January 1982
 Activated on 1 October 1982
 Inactivated on 15 September 1993
 Activated on 1 July 1994

Assignments

 Post Headquarters, Kelly Field, 20 August 1917
 Aviation Concentration Center, 30 September 1917
 Headquarters Air Service, AEF, 11–16 November 1917
 Third Aviation Instruction Center, 16 November 1917
 1st Pursuit Organization Center, 16 February 1918
 1st Pursuit Group, 5 May 1918
 1st Air Depot, 11 December 1918
 Advanced Section Services of Supply, 6 February 1919
 Eastern Department, 1–18 March 1919
 1st Pursuit Group, 12 August 1919
 Air Corps Training Center, c. 7 June-31 July 1927
 Unknown, 1 June 1928 – 30 May 1929

 17th Pursuit Group (later 17th Attack; 17th Bombardment Group), 31 May 1929 – 26 November 1945 (attached to 7th Bombardment Group until 29 October 1931)
 17th Bombardment Group, 19 May 1947 – 10 September 1948
 17th Bombardment Group, 10 May 1952 – 25 June 1958 (attached to 17th Bombardment Wing after 8 June 1957)
 17th Reconnaissance Wing, 1 October 1982
 9th Strategic Reconnaissance Wing (later 9th Reconnaissance) Wing), 30 June 1991 – 15 September 1993
 55th Operations Group, 1 July 1994 – present

Stations

 Kelly Field, Texas, 20 August 1917
 Hazelhurst Field, New York, 5–27 October 1917
 Liverpool, England, 10 November 1917
 British Rest Camp #2, Le Havre, France, 13 November 1917
 Issoudun Aerodrome, France, 16 November 1917
 Villeneuve-les-Vertus Aerodrome, France, 16 February 1918
 Epiez Aerodrome, France, 1 April 1918
 Gengault Aerodrome, Toul, France, 4 May 1918
 Touquin Aerodrome, France, 28 June 1918
 Saints Aerodrome, France, 9 July 1918
 Rembercourt Aerodrome, France, 2 September 1918
 Flight operated from Verdun Aerodrome, France, 7–11 November 1918
 Colombey-les-Belles Airdrome, France, 11 December 1918
 Brest, France, France, 6–19 February 1919
 Camp Mills, New York, 1 March 1919
 Mitchell Field, New York, 4–18 March 1919
 Selfridge Field, Michigan, 12 August 1919
 Kelly Field, Texas, 31 August 1919
 Ellington Field, Texas, 1 July 1921
 Selfridge Field, Michigan, 1 July 1922
 March Field, California, 7 June-31 July 1927
 Rockwell Field, California, 1 June 1928
 March Field, California, 29 October 1931
 Rockwell Field, California, 3 May 1932
 March Field, California, 14 May 1932
 Rockwell Field, California, 1 July 1932

 March Field, California, 9 August 1932
 Rentschler Field, Connecticut, 2 May 1938
 March Field, California, 20 May 1938 (operated from Kern County Airport, California, 14–26 January 1940
 McChord Field, Washington, 26 June 1940
 Pendleton Field, Oregon, 29 June 1941
 Lexington County Airport, South Carolina, 15 February 1942
 Barksdale Field, Louisiana, 24 June-18 Nov 1942
 Telergma Airfield, Algeria, c. 24 December 1942
 Sedrata Airfield, Algeria, 14 May 1943
 Djedeida Airfield, Tunisia, 25 June 1943
 Villacidro Airfield, Sardinia, France, c. 5 December 1943
 Poretta Airfield, Corsica, Italy, c. 19 September 1944
 Dijon Airfield (Y-9), France, c. 21 November 1944
 Linz Airport, Austria, c. 14 June 1945
 Ebensee, Austria (Ground echelon), 5 July 1945
 Clastres Airfield, France, c. 3 October-c. 17 November 1945
 Camp Myles Standish, Massachusetts, 25–26 November 1945
 Langley Field, Virginia, 19 May 1947 – 10 September 1948
 Pusan East (K-9) Air Base, South Korea, 10 May 1952 (operated from Pusan West Air Base (K-1), South Korea, 1 October-20 December 1952)
 Miho Air Base, Japan, c. 9 October 1954 – c. 19 March 1955
 Hurlburt Field, Florida, 1 April 1955 – 25 June 1958
 RAF Alconbury, England, 1 October 1982 – 15 September 1993
 RAF Mildenhall, England, 1 July 1994 – present

Aircraft

 Nieuport 28, 1917–1918
 SPAD S.XIII, 1918, 1919
 Royal Aircraft Factory S.E.5, 1919–1922
 Thomas-Morse MB-3, 1922–1925
 Fokker D.VII, 1919–1925
 Dayton-Wright DH-4, 1919–1925
 Curtiss PW–8 Hawk, 1924–1926
 Curtiss P-1 Hawk, 1925–1927
 Boeing PW-9, 1928–1929
 Boeing P-12, 1929–1934, 1935–1936
 Boeing P-26 Peashooter, 1934–1935
 Northrop A-17, 1936–1939
 Douglas B-18 Bolo, 1939–1940
 Douglas B-23 Dragon, 1940–1941
 North American B-25 Mitchell, 1941–1942
 Martin B-26 Marauder, 1942–1945
 Douglas B-26 Invader, 1952–1956
 Douglas B-66 Destroyer, 1956–1958
 Lockheed U-2, 1991–1993
 Lockheed TR-1, 1991–1993
 Boeing RC-135U Combat Sent, 1994–present
 Boeing RC-135V Rivet Joint, 1994–present
 Boeing RC-135W Rivet Joint, 1994–present
 Boeing OC-135B Open Skies, 1994–present

See also

 List of American Aero Squadrons

References
 Notes

 Citations

Bibliography

External links
 Offutt Air Force Base web site
 14 July 2008 – 90th anniversary Commemoration of 27th, 94th, 95th, 147th aero squadrons in France
 95th Reconnaissance Squadron [95th RS]

095
Military units and formations established in 1982